Time Waits For No Man is the first solo album by rapper/emcee Rasco. It was executive produced by Peanut Butter Wolf. It was released July 21, 1998, on Stones Throw Records, and distributed by Nu Gruv.

Track listing

References

1998 albums
Stones Throw Records albums
Rasco albums